The following is an incomplete list of wars fought by Croatia, by Croatian people or regular armies during periods when independent Croatian states existed, from the early Middle Ages to the present day.

The list gives the name, the date, combatants, and the result of these conflicts following this legend:



Duchy of Croatia (7th century–925)

Kingdom of Croatia (925–1102)

Croatia in personal union with Hungary (1102–1527)

Croatia within the Habsburg Monarchy (1527–1918)

Kingdom of Yugoslavia, WWII and post-war Yugoslavia (1918–1991)

Republic of Croatia (1991–present)

References 

Croatia
Military history of Croatia
Wars
Wars